Sciteconus is a subgenus of sea snails, marine gastropod mollusks in the genus Conus, family Conidae, the cone snails and their allies.

In the latest classification of the family Conidae by Puillandre N., Duda T.F., Meyer C., Olivera B.M. & Bouchet P. (2015), Sciteconus has become a subgenus of Conus as Conus (Sciteconus)da Motta, 1991  (type species: Conus algoensis G. B. Sowerby I, 1834) represented as Conus Linnaeus, 1758

Species
 Sciteconus algoensis (G.B. Sowerby I, 1834) represented as Conus algoensis G. B. Sowerby I, 1834 (alternate representation)
 Sciteconus bairstowi (G.B. Sowerby III, 1889) represented as Conus bairstowi G. B. Sowerby III, 1889 (alternate representation)
 Sciteconus brianhayesi (Korn, 2001) represented as Conus brianhayesi Korn, 2001 (alternate representation)
 Sciteconus gradatulus (Weinkauff, 1875) represented as Conus gradatulus Weinkauff, 1875 (alternate representation)
 Sciteconus infrenatus (Reeve, 1848) represented as Conus infrenatus Reeve, 1848 (alternate representation)
 Sciteconus mozambicus (Hwass in Bruguière, 1792) represented as Conus mozambicus Hwass in Bruguière, 1792 (alternate representation)
 Sciteconus pictus (Reeve, 1843) represented as Conus pictus Reeve, 1843 (alternate representation)

References

External links
 To World Register of Marine Species

Conidae
Gastropod subgenera